During World War I a number of countries were conquered and controlled. Some of these countries were subsequently given new names and new government leaders loyal to the conquering country. These countries are known as puppet states. Germany and the Ottoman Empire were the two countries with puppet states. The Allies had many more puppet states than all the Central Powers collectively: the United Kingdom had the largest empire in the world.

In addition, several countries captured land in the years leading up to the war, which then became puppet states; those states which are immediately relevant to the war are also included here.

Central Powers

German Empire

The German Empire had a number of puppet states during World War I. All the states were previously under Russian control and had long been of interest to the regime.

Ottoman Empire

Allies

Others

These countries were not under the control of the warring parties, but were created during the war. Specific countries were created for individual needs.

References

puppet states
Former client states